Leonisa is a Colombian clothing company manufacturing and selling lingerie, shapewear, swimwear, underwear, and activewear for both men and women.

History 
Leonisa was established in November 1956 by the Urrea brothers, Joaquin Eduardo and Julio Ernesto, who specialized in women's innerwear. After establishing their first manufacturing plant, the brothers created “The Diamond Point Bra”.

Leonisa began retail sales in 1956. These consist of Leonisa Stores, duty-free shops, factory outlets, hypermarkets, department stores, and specialty apparel stores. As of 2014, there were retail stores in the United States, Spain, Chile, Colombia, Costa Rica, Ecuador, Guatemala, Mexico, Panama, Peru, Portugal, and Puerto Rico.

In 1965, Leonisa built a manufacturing plant in Costa Rica to meet the demands of Central American markets. In 1989, Leonisa entered the European market first in Spain, later expanding to the United Kingdom, Germany, France, and Italy.

In 1993, Leonisa launched the “Magic Up” brassiere. The same year, they created a catalog sales channel to sell Leonisa garments directly to customers on a monthly basis. The catalog sales channel operates in the United States, Canada, Mexico, Spain, Colombia, Peru, Costa Rica, Ecuador, Chile, Guatemala, and Puerto Rico.

Leonisa has sponsored the Miss Colombia swimwear category since 2007. Each year, Leonisa develops swimwear campaigns focused on Miss Colombia. Leonisa also sponsored Miss Panama in 2009 and 2010.

In June 2009, Leonisa introduced their online store, initially intended for the US and Canadian markets.

In February 2020, Leonisa partnered with Victoria's Secret in a deal that makes Leonisa's shapewear available to Victoria's Secret online customers with the possibility of expanding into Victoria's Secret retail outlets.

Products

Women’s intimate apparel 
Leonisa has product lines for shapewear, bras and panties, including collections that meet specific needs, like postpartum and post-surgical shapewear and sports underwear.

In 2009, Leonisa introduced a brand that targets girls and women between the ages of 14 and 25.

Leonisa is known for its shapewear, featuring four different compression levels, each employing Leonisa's trademark compression technology. In 2012, the company launched a new line of smart fabric shapewear and post-surgical compression garments.

Swimwear 
Launched in the 1990s, the swimwear line includes basic swimwear, one-piece swimsuits, control and slimming swimwear, push up swimsuit tops and cover ups, and other products.

LEO 
Leonisa launched its first men's underwear collection in 1975 under the Airell brand. In the 1980s, this men's line was re-branded as LEO. The LEO brand offers men's underwear and shapewear, including three levels of compression.

Activewear
Leonisa has activewear lines for both women and for men. Leonisa ActiveLife and Leo ActiveLife includes breathable underwear, leggings (often with incorporated shaping fabric such as DuraFit' and PowerSlim'), and sports bras.

Campaigns 
Leonisa has partnered with health companies in a campaign against breast cancer seeking to raise awareness among women about the importance of early detection. As a part of this campaign, Leonisa developed educational teams in schools, universities, and shopping centers.

The company also developed the app “Leonisa Takes Care of You” to remind women of the right time to do their breast self-exam.

Awards 
2001 - Lyon Mode City, Best new design

2006 - Antioquia's Shield, Gold Category

2007 - Cromos Fashion Awards - Best Brand Runway

2010 - Colombia Spain Award - Best Company of the Year

External links 
2010 - WWD Magazine – Celebrities Energize Shapewear Market

2014 - Sports Illustrated - The latest swimwear styles for Leonisa modelled by Nina Agdal

References

Lingerie brands
Lingerie retailers
Swimwear brands
Underwear brands
Clothing brands
Clothing companies of Colombia
Clothing companies established in 1956
1956 establishments in Colombia
Colombian brands